was a machine-gunner and sergeant in the Imperial Japanese Army during the Second World War. He was among the last hold-outs to surrender after the war ended.

War years and post-war survival
When the Americans liberated Guam in July 1944, Itō was separated from his unit. He hid with two other soldiers and learned to survive in the jungle. For sixteen years, he hid even after finding leaflets declaring that the war had ended.

Surrender
When the last of his companions, Bunzō Minagawa (皆川文蔵), was captured by woodsmen in 1960, Itō was convinced to surrender on 23 May 1960 and was treated at a nearby American military base.

Later life
Itō married on January 7, 1961, and had a daughter. A movie was made about his life. He later worked as a watchman for the Toei Motion Picture Company in Tokyo. He wrote a book about his experiences entitled The Emperor's Last Soldiers, published in 1967.

References

1921 births
2004 deaths
Japanese holdouts
Imperial Japanese Army personnel of World War II
Imperial Japanese Army soldiers
Japanese expatriates in Guam